The Opel Slalom was a mid-size luxury concept car that was manufactured by the car manufacturer Opel in collaboration with the design company Bertone. The car was first presented to the public at the Geneva Motor Show in March 1996. The Slalom had one such 2.0-litre turbocharged 16-valve I4 engine which produced  and used the layout of F4. 

The same engine was also used in the production Opel Calibra, which was produced from 1989 to 1997.

References

External links

Slalom
Slalom
Cars introduced in 1996
All-wheel-drive vehicles
Executive cars
Coupés